Trevor Neville (born 1987) is an athlete in the sport of Taekwondo from the United States. Neville trains under Guy, Jason and Justin Poos. His home and his gym, Poos Taekwondo, are located in Edmond, OK. Poos Taekwondo is a Progression Sports member. He is attending San Juan Physical Therapy Assistant school in Farmington, NM and has a bachelor's degree in Kinesiology/Exercise Physiology at the University of Central Oklahoma University of Central Oklahoma.
He fights in the Light weight division (-162 lbs/-72 kg) and Olympic Light/Welter weight division (-176 lbs/-76 kg). Once ranked 7th in the world, as of October 1, 2009 Trevor is ranked 16th in the world in his respective weight division.

Trevor Neville's USA athlete profile can be viewed at USA Taekwondo's official site.

Stats

Awards and Competition Record 
Awards
 2007 National Collegiate Taekwondo Association Male Athlete of the Year
 2006 National Collegiate Taekwondo Association Male Freshman Athlete of the Year
Competition'''
2010 USAT National Championships (Light):  BRONZE
2010 Dallas National Qualifier (Light):  GOLD
2010 USAT National B-Team Member (Light)
2009 U-24 National Team Member (Light)
2009 U-24 National Team Trials (Light): 1st
2009 USAT National Championships (Light): SILVER
2009 Colorado Springs National Qualifier (Light): BRONZE
2009 U.S. Open (Light): SILVER
2007 National Collegiate Championships (Light): GOLD
2006 National Collegiate Team Trials (Light): SILVER
2006 National Collegiate Championships (Light): GOLD
2006 Senior National Team Trials (Bantam): 3rd
2005 Senior Nationals (Bantam): BRONZE
2004 Junior US National Team member
2003 Junior Olympics:  SILVER
2002 Junior Olympics:  BRONZE
2000 Junior Olympics:  GOLD

Notable Family Members 
Trevor is the younger brother of successful USA National Team member Jason Neville, also a multiple time world medalist.

References 

Living people
American male taekwondo practitioners
1987 births
Sportspeople from Edmond, Oklahoma
University of Central Oklahoma alumni